H Scorpii (H Sco) is a single star in the southern constellation Scorpius. It is faintly visible to the naked eye with an apparent visual magnitude of 4.18. The star is located at a distance of approximately 343 light-years from the Sun based on parallax measurements, but is drifting closer with a radial velocity of −2 km/s. This star was initially given the Bayer designation Beta Normae by Lacaille but it was later reassigned from Norma to Scorpius.

This is an aging giant star with a stellar classification of K6III. After exhausting the supply of hydrogen at its core, this star cooled and expanded off the main sequence. It now has around 53 times the radius of the Sun. The star is about 2.2 billion years old with only a mild level of magnetic activity, and is spinning with a projected rotational velocity of 3.1 km/s. It is radiating 4–600 times the Sun's luminosity from its enlarged photosphere at an effective temperature of 3,875 K.

References

K-type giants
Suspected variables
Scorpius (constellation)
Scorpii, H
Durchmusterung objects
149447
081304
6166